The 1960 South Dakota gubernatorial election was held on November 8, 1960.

Incumbent Democratic Governor Ralph Herseth was defeated by Republican nominee Archie M. Gubbrud, who won 50.73% of the vote.

Primary elections
Primary elections were held on June 7, 1960.

Democratic primary

Candidates
Ralph Herseth, incumbent Governor

Results

Republican primary

Candidates
Archie M. Gubbrud, Speaker of the South Dakota House of Representatives

Results

General election

Candidates
Ralph Herseth, Democratic
Archie M. Gubbrud, Republican

Results

References

Bibliography
 

1960
South Dakota
Gubernatorial
November 1960 events in the United States